Neodymium molybdate is an inorganic compound, with the chemical formula of Nd2(MoO4)3. It reacts with sodium molybdate at a high temperature to obtain NaNd(MoO4)2. It reacts at roughly 350°C to 700°C with hydrogen sulfide to obtain neodymium sulfide and molybdenum disulfide. At roughly 780K to 870K, it can be reduced by hydrogen to obtain Nd2Mo3O9.

Preparation
It can be prepared by reacting neodymium oxide and molybdenum trioxide at a high temperature:

Nd2O3 + 3MoO3 → Nd2(MoO4)3

It can also be prepared by reacting neodymium nitrate and (NH4)6Mo7O24, treating the obtained precipitate at a high temperature.

References

Neodymium compounds
molybdates